Megachile santiaguensis is a species of bee in the family Megachilidae. It was described by Silvana Patricia Durante in 1996.

References

Santiaguensis
Insects described in 1996